This is a list of notable tourist attractions in South Korea. The list may include temples, museums, aquariums, landmarks, sports venues, markets, shopping districts, or other notable locations popular with tourists.

0–9 
 63 Building
 63 Seaworld

A 
 Anapji
 Apsan Park
 Art Center Nabi
 Artsonje Center

B 
 Bamseom
 Bangsan Market
 Bangudae Petroglyphs
 Bank of Korea Museum
 Banwolseong
 Bell of King Seongdeok
 Beomeosa
 Bomun Lake Resort
 Bongeunsa
 Bongmu Leports Park
 Bongsan Art Fair
 Bongwonsa
 Borisa Sitting Buddha
 Bosingak
 Bukchon Art Museum
 Bukhansanseong
 Bukhansansillajinheungwangsunsubi
 Bulguksa Temple
 Busan Aquarium
 Busan Asiad Main Stadium
 Busan Cinema Center
 Busan Exhibition and Convention Center
 Busan Gudeok Stadium
 Busan Lotte World Tower
 Busan Marine Natural History Museum
 Busan Tower
 Busan Yachting Center

C 
 Changdeokgung
 Changgyeonggung
 Changuimun
 Cheonggyecheon
 Cheongpung Cultural Properties
 Children's Grand Park
 Chiwoo Craft Museum
 Chohong Museum of Finance
 Chojun Textile & Quilt Art Museum
 Chung Young Yang Embroidery Museum
 COEX Aquarium
 COEX Mall
 Coreana Cosmetic Museum

D 
 Dabotap
 Daedeokje
 Daegaksa
 Daegu Baseball Stadium
 Daegu Civic Stadium
 Daegu Hyanggyo
 Daegu International Opera Festival
 Daegu National Museum
 Daegu Opera House
 Daegu Stadium
 Daegu Yangnyeongsi Festival
 Daejeon Museum of Art
 Daeseongsa
 Daesong Agricultural Market
 Daeunsan
 Daeyang Gallery and House
 Dalmasa
 Dalseong Park
 Demilitarized Zone (DMZ)
 Deoksugung
 Dongdaemun Market
 Donghwasa
 Dongmyo
 Dongseongno Festival
 Donuimun
 Dosan Ahn Chang-ho Memorial Hall
 Dosan Park
 Doseonsa
 Duryu Park

E 
 Eight Views of Danyang
 Eight Views of Korea
 Eonyang Market
 Everland
 Expo Science Park

F 
 Fortress Wall of Seoul

G 
 Gaeunsa
 Gahoe Museum
 Gajisan (Gyeongsang-do)
 Gamnoam
 Gamsammot Park
 Gangchang Park
 Ganjeolgot
 Gansong Art Museum
 Garak Market
 Garden 5
 Geumjeongsan
 Geumjeongsanseong
 Geumseonsa
 Global Village Folk Museum
 Goseong Dinosaur Museum
 Gudeok Baseball Stadium
 Gukchae-bosang Memorial Park
 Gukje Market
 Gukjeong chumyo
 Gwaneumsa (Seoul)
 Gwangan Bridge
 Gwanghuimun
 Gwanghwamun Plaza
 Gwanghwamun
 Gwangjang Market
 Gyeongbokgung
 Gyeongdong Market
 Gyeongguksa
 Gyeonghuigung
 Gyeongju Folk Craft Village
 Gyeongju Historic Areas
 Gyeongju National Museum
 Gyeongju Seokbinggo
 Gyeongju Tower
 Gyeongsang-gamyeong Park
 Gyerim
 Gyeryongsan National Park

H 
 Haksan Park
 Han Sang Soo Embroidery Museum
 Hanul Science Museum
 Hanwon Museum of Art
 Hengso Museum
 Heojun Museum
 Heosimcheong Spa
 Herbhillz
 Heunginjimun
 Hongcheonsa
 Hongneung Arboretum
 Horim Museum
 Hwajeong Museum
 Hwanghak-dong Flea Market
 Hwangnyongsa
 Hwangseong Park
 Hwanseon Cave
 Hwawon Park
 Hyehwamun
 Hyochang Park

I 
 Ilmin Museum of Art
 ImageRoot Museum
 Incheon Asiad Main Stadium
 Incheon Chinatown
 Incheon Football Stadium
 Incheon Munhak Stadium
 Independence Gate
 Insa-dong
 Inwangsa

K 
 Kim Koo Museum
 Kimchi Field Museum
 Korea Furniture Museum
 Korea Museum of Modern Costume
 Korea Racing Authority Equine Museum
 Korea University Museum
 Korean Magazine Museum
 Kumho Art Hall
 Kumho Museum of Art
 Kyujanggak
 Kyungpook National University Museum

L 
 Leeum, Samsung Museum of Art
 Lock Museum
 Lotte World Folk Museum
 Lotte World

M 
 Manworam
 Marronnier Park
 Milal Museum of Art
 Mokin Museum
 Munhak Baseball Stadium
 Muryongsan (Ulsan)
 Museum for Daegu National University of Education
 Museum of Korea Straw and Plants Handicraft
 Museum of Korean Buddhist Art
 Museum of Korean Culture
 Museum of Korean Embroidery
 Museum of Korean Modern Literature
 Museum of Photography, Seoul
 Myogaksa
 Myojakdo

N 
 N Seoul Tower
 Naeuiwon
 Naewonsa
 Nakdong River Battle Museum
 Nakseongdae
 Namdaemun Market
 Namdaemun
 Namiseom
 Namsan cable car
 National Folk Museum of Korea
 National Maritime Museum, South Korea
 National Museum of Korea
 National Palace Museum of Korea
 National Theater of Korea
 Nonghyup Agricultural Museum
 Noryangjin Fisheries Wholesale Market

O 
 Olympic Park, Seoul
 Olympic Stadium (Seoul)
 Olympic Velodrome (Seoul)
 Olympic Weightlifting Gymnasium
 Onggi Folk Museum

P 
 Paper Art Museum
 Posco Art Museum
 Presseum
 Preview in Daegu

R 
 Rodin Gallery

T 
 Taedok Science Town Monorail
 Taehwa Comprehensive Market
 Taehwa River
 Taejongdae
 Tancheon
 Tapgol Park
 The Abraham Park Kenneth Vine Collection
 The Eight Gates of Seoul
 The Garden of Morning Calm
 The Museum of Medicine
 Tibet Museum (South Korea)
 Tongdosa
 Total Museum of Contemporary Art
 Ttangkkeut
 Tteok & Kitchen Utensil Museum

U 
 Udo Island
 Ulsan Central Market
 Ulsan Culture & Arts Center
 Ulsan Grand Park
 Ulsan Lightning Market
 Ulsan Museum
 Ulsan Science Museum
 Ulsan Wholesale Agricultural and Fish Market
 Ultra Architecture Museum
 Unamji Waterside Park
 Unhyeongung
 United Nations Memorial Cemetery

W 
 War Memorial of Korea
 West Seoul Lake Park
 Whanki Museum
 Wolbong Market
 Wolgwang Waterside Park
 Wolmyeong Park
 Wolmyeongdong
 Wongudan
 Woori Bank Museum
 World Cup Fountain
 World Jewellery Museum

Y 
 Yaeum Market
 Yeongnam Alps
 Yongdusan Park
 Yongsan Electronics Market
 Yonsei University
 YoungIn Museum of Literature

See also 

 Korea Tourism Organization
 List of World Heritage Sites in South Korea
 List of markets in South Korea
 National Treasures of South Korea